The 1999 Tour de France was the 86th edition of Tour de France, one of cycling's Grand Tours. The Tour began in Le Puy du Fou with a prologue individual time trial on 3 July and Stage 10 occurred on 14 July with a mountainous stage to Alpe d'Huez. The race finished on the Champs-Élysées in Paris on 25 July.

Prologue
3 July 1999 — Le Puy du Fou,  (individual time trial)

Stage 1
4 July 1999 — Montaigu to Challans,

Stage 2
5 July 1999 — Challans to Saint-Nazaire,

Stage 3
6 July 1999 — Nantes to Laval,

Stage 4
7 July 1999 — Laval to Blois,

Stage 5
8 July 1999 — Bonneval to Amiens,

Stage 6
9 July 1999 — Amiens to Maubeuge,

Stage 7
10 July 1999 — Avesnes-sur-Helpe to Thionville,

Stage 8
11 July 1999 — Metz,  (individual time trial)

Stage 9
13 July 1999 — Le Grand-Bornand to Sestrières,

Stage 10
14 July 1999 — Sestrières to Alpe d'Huez,

References

1999 Tour de France
Tour de France stages